Bala Anandan  (born 1923 - November 2, 2017) an Indian politician and was a Member of the Legislative Assembly. He was elected to the Tamil Nadu legislative assembly as a Dravida Munnetra Kazhagam (DMK) candidate from Vandavasi constituency in the 1996 election. The constituency was reserved for candidates from the Scheduled Castes.

References 

1923 births
2017 deaths
Dravida Munnetra Kazhagam politicians
Tamil Nadu MLAs 1996–2001